The 16th Maine Infantry Regiment was an infantry regiment that served in the Union Army during the American Civil War. It was particularly noted for its service during the 1863 Battle of Gettysburg.

Organization and Assignments
The 16th Maine  was organized at Augusta, Maine, and mustered into Federal service for a three-year enlistment on August 14, 1862. It departed for Washington, D.C. in 1862. Likely assigned to 3rd Brigade, 2nd Division, 3rd Army Corps, Army of Virginia, to September, 1862. Assigned to 3rd Brigade, 2nd Division, 1st Army Corps, Army of the Potomac, to May, 1863. 1st Brigade, 2nd Division, 1st Army Corps, to March, 1864. 1st Brigade, 2nd Division, 5th Army Corps, to June, 1864. 1st Brigade, 3rd Division, 5th Army Corps, to August, 1864 or later. 2nd Brigade, 3rd Division, 5th Army Corps by February 7, 1865, to April 9, 1865, or perhaps to June, 1865.

1862
Served in the Maryland Campaign September to October.

To repel the invasion of Maryland by the Confederates, the Army of the Potomac moved northward from Washington with its front extending from near the Baltimore and Ohio Railroad to the Potomac River. On September 12, the First Corps bivouacked on the south side of the Monocacy near the crossing of the National Road (now called the Old National Road, old US 40). At the Battle of South Mountain on September 14, Joseph Hooker's I Corps attacked the Confederates holding Turner's Pass while preventing a potential flanking maneuver to its north.

The 16th Maine was detached as railroad guard during the Battle of Antietam on September 17, 1862, according to the Antietam Union order of battle. At Pleasant Valley / Sharpsburg until October 30.

Movement to Warrenton, thence to Falmouth, Virginia, October 30 to November 19. Fought at the Battle of Fredericksburg, Virginia, from December 12 to 15.

1863
The regiment was part of the infamous "Mud March" January 20–24, 1863. At Falmouth and Belle Plain until April 27. Participated in the Chancellorsville Campaign April 27 to May 6. Operations at Pollock's Mill Creek April 29-May 2. Fitzhugh's Crossing April 29–30. Battle of Chancellorsville May 2–5. Gettysburg Campaign June 11-July 24. Battle of Gettysburg July 1–3. Picket duty along the Rapidan until October --. Bristoe Campaign October 9–22. Advance to line of the Rappahanock November 7–8. Mine Run Campaign November 26-December 2.

Gettysburg
Around 11: 30 on the morning of July 1, 1863, two divisions of the 1st Corps, Army of the Potomac arrived to join a fight that had been raging all morning, as the Confederates advanced on Gettysburg from the west and from the north. Among them was the 16th Maine. The regiment, along with the rest of the army, had been marching since June 12 up from Virginia, through Maryland, and into southern Pennsylvania. They were headed toward an eventual clash with the Confederate Army that was fated to take place in and around the little market town of Gettysburg. The 16th Maine fought bitterly for approximately three hours in the fields north of the Chambersburg Pike; but by mid-afternoon, it was evident that, even with the addition of the rest of the 1st Corps and the entire 11th Corps, the position of the Union forces could not be held. They began to fall back toward the town of Gettysburg.

The 16th Maine was then ordered to withdraw to a new position to the east of where they had been fighting. "Take that position and hold it at any cost!" was the command. This meant that those of the 275 officers and men of the regiment who had not already become casualties had to sacrifice themselves to allow some 16,000 other men to retreat. This they valiantly did, but they were soon overwhelmed and forced to surrender to the Confederates. Historians say the 16th Maine fought valiantly, but its soldiers turned their attention to saving their beloved flags when they realized that defeat was inevitable. As the Southern troops bore down upon them, the men of the 16th Maine spontaneously began to tear up into little pieces their "colors."

Like other Union regiments, the 16th Maine carried an American flag and a regimental flag, known collectively as "the colors." "For a few last moments our little regiment defended angrily its hopeless challenge, but it was useless to fight longer," Abner Small of the 16th Maine wrote after the battle. "We looked at our colors, and our faces burned. We must not surrender those symbols of our pride and our faith." The regiment's color bearers "appealed to the colonel," Small wrote, "and with his consent they tore the flags from the staves and ripped the silk into shreds; and our officers and men that were near took each a shred."  Each man hid his fragment of the flags inside his shirt or in a pocket. The Confederates were thus deprived of the chance to capture the flags as battle trophies.  That was the 16th Maine's "greatest day," wrote Earl Hess, a history professor at Lincoln Memorial University in Tennessee, in an introduction to a collection of Small's Civil War letters published in 2000. Hess said that the 16th Maine's actions show that battle flags carried "very, very deep symbolism for Civil War soldiers, "representing the "esprit de corps" of a regiment and "a larger entity -- the country, the cause." Most of the 16th Maine survivors treasured these remnants for the rest of their lives and bequeathed them to their descendants, some of whom still possess them as family heirlooms to this day.

By sunset on July 1, 11 officers and men of the 16th Maine had been killed, 62 had been wounded, and 159 had been taken prisoner. Only 38 men of the Regiment managed to evade being captured and report for duty at 1st Corps headquarters. But the 16th Maine had bought precious time for the Union Army. Those whose retreat they had covered were able to establish a very strong position just east and south of the center of the town of Gettysburg along Cemetery Ridge. During the night and into July 2 the 1st and 11th Corps were reinforced by the rest of the Army of the Potomac. For the next two days they would withstand successive assaults by the Confederates until the final repulse of Pickett's Charge, on July 3.

1864
Duty on the Orange & Alexandria Railroad until April, 1864. Demonstrations on the Rapidan February 6–7. Campaign from the Rapidan to the James May–June. Battle of the Wilderness May 5–7; Spottsylvania May 8–12; Spottsylvania Court House May 12–21. Assault on the Salient May 12. North Anna River May 23–26. Jericho Ford May 23. Line of the Pamunkey June 26–28. Totopotomoy May 28–31. Cold Harbor June 1–12. Bethesda Church June 1–3. White Oak Swamp June 13. Before Petersburg June 16–18. Siege of Petersburg June 16-July 14.

1865
The regiment was discharged from service on June 5, 1865.

Total strength and casualties
1,907 men served in the 16th Maine Infantry Regiment at one point or another during its service.  It lost 181 enlisted men killed in action or died of wounds.  578 members of the regiment were wounded in action, 259 died of disease, and 76 died in Confederate prisons for a total of 511 fatalities from all causes, a rate of 57%.

See also

 List of Maine Civil War units
 Maine in the American Civil War

Notes

References
 
 State of Maine Civil War Website Page on the 16th Maine
 The Civil War Archive
 Small, Abner R. The Sixteenth Maine Regiment In The War Of The Rebellion
Small, Abner, "The Road to Richmond: The Civil War [Recollections] of Major Abner R Small of the 16th Maine Volunteers", Small, Harold ed. Fordham University Press, 2000.

Units and formations of the Union Army from Maine
1862 establishments in Maine
Military units and formations established in 1862
Military units and formations disestablished in 1865